Grunsky's inequalities may refer to

 Inequalities related to a Grunsky matrix
 An inequality used in the proof of Grunsky's theorem